The  was a Japanese resistance organization founded during the Second Sino-Japanese War. It was founded in 1939 by Japanese soldiers taken prisoner by the Eighth Route Army. According to Japanese historian Saburo Ienaga, this was the first antiwar activity by prisoners in the Communist areas.

See also 
Japanese People's Anti-war Alliance
Japanese dissidence during the early Shōwa period
Japanese People's Emancipation League

References

World War II resistance movements
Second Sino-Japanese War
Japanese rebels
Organizations established in 1939
1939 establishments in China
Japanese Resistance